Alex William Purver (born 1 December 1995) is an English professional footballer who plays as a midfielder for  club Darlington. Purver began his football career with home-town club Leeds United as a six-year-old, progressed through the academy to captain their under-21 team, but left in 2017 for National League club Guiseley, where he had already spent two spells on loan. Two years later, he signed professional terms for Östersund, for which he made eight Allsvenskan appearances over an 18-month contract. He returned to England and joined Darlington for the 2020–21 season.

Life and career
Purver was born in 1995 in Leeds. He joined Leeds United's academy as a six-year-old, took up a two-year scholarship in 2012, and in his first season as a scholar, was a regular in the under-18 side that won the U18 Professional Development League North Divisiontheir record included a 12-match unbeaten runand reached the fifth round of the FA Youth Cup. Purver signed a one-year professional contract in 2014, and was given a first-team squad number. He regularly captained their under-21 team in 2014–15, although he played less in his preferred position of central midfielder than he did filling in at right back or elsewhere, and travelled with Neil Redfearn's squad for a Championship match at Birmingham City, but was not in the matchday 18.

Purver's contract was extended for a further year in 2015, and again in 2016, when he played in first-team pre-season friendlies, and then went on loan to Guiseley to gain experience of competitive men's football. He was a regular in the team, playing 21 National League matches and scoring twice before returning to his parent club in January 2017. Having had no further involvement with Leeds' first team, Purver rejoined Guiseley in March on loan to the end of the season, before joining the club permanently on 1 August 2017 after his release from Leeds.

He began the new season in the Guiseley team, but his progress was disrupted by a combination of a heavy defeat at Leyton Orient on 2 September in which he conceded two penalties, a change of management and a hamstring injury, and he did not return to the side until late November. Against a background of "constant chopping and changing" of players and a second managerial dismissal, Purver finished the season with 28 league appearances, mainly as a starter, as Guiseley were relegated to the National League North. He was one of just nine players retained, and missed only one match in all competitions over the 2018–19 season. He helped Guiseley progress from the second qualifying round of the FA Cup to the second round proper. In the first round, Guiseley took a 4–0 lead before League Two opponents Cambridge United scored three times to produce a nervy finish.

At the end of the season, Purver was invited for a trial with Swedish club Östersunds FK. The trial was successful, and in July 2019 he signed an 18-month deal. He made his debut for Östersund on 21 July, playing the whole of a 3–0 loss to Norrköping in the Allsvenskan. He made eight Allsvenskan appearances before leaving the club when his contract expired. While playing semi-professionally for Guiseley, Purver had coached at the Leeds United academy, and after he joined Östersund, he set up a coaching programme for individuals and small groups in the city.

After returning to England, Purver trained with Hartlepool United with the intention of signing a short-term deal, but the uncertainty caused by the COVID-19 pandemic meant he was unable to find a new club. On 5 July 2021, he signed for Darlington of the National League North. He made his debut as a first-half substitute in Darlington's first match of the season, a 3–2 defeat at home to Alfreton Town.

Career statistics

References

External links

Living people
1995 births
Footballers from Leeds
Association football midfielders
English footballers
Leeds United F.C. players
Guiseley A.F.C. players
Östersunds FK players
Darlington F.C. players
National League (English football) players
Allsvenskan players
English expatriate footballers
English expatriate sportspeople in Sweden